Charles Robert Charlwood (22 November 1842 – 16 May 1880) was an English cricketer.  Charlwood was a right-handed batsman who bowled right-arm medium pace.  He was born at Horsham, Sussex.

Charlwood made his first-class debut for Sussex against the Marylebone Cricket Club at Royal Brunswick Ground, Hove in 1866.  He made two further first-class appearances for Sussex, both in 1869 against Lancashire at Old Trafford, and Kent at the Higher Common Ground, Tunbridge Wells.  In his three first-class matches, he scored a total of 40 runs at an average of 8.00, with a high score of 15.

He died at the town of his birth on 16 May 1880.  His brother, Henry, played in England's first ever Test match against Australia in 1877.

References

External links
Charles Charlwood at ESPNcricinfo
Charles Charlwood at CricketArchive

1842 births
1880 deaths
People from Horsham
English cricketers
Sussex cricketers